The murder of Isabella de Oliveira Nardoni was one of the most infamous infanticide cases in Brazil. On the night of 29 March 2008, five-year-old Isabella died from severe injuries after being thrown out of the sixth floor of the building where she lived with her father Alexandre Alves Nardoni, stepmother Anna Carolina Jatobá and newborn siblings in North São Paulo. Investigations concluded that the girl had been physically abused by her caretakers and both were condemned for intentional homicide.

Brazilian media has closely followed the case, offering continuous updates. A survey suggested that more than 98% of Brazilians are aware of her death—the highest percentage in the history of Brazilian media coverage research.

Family

Isabella was born on 18 April 2002 in São Paulo, Brazil, to Alexandre Alves Nardoni and Ana Carolina Cunha de Oliveira. Alexandre had met Oliveira when they were in school, and they dated for three years. Oliveira became unexpectedly pregnant with Isabella when she was 17 and, by that time, Nardoni was about to begin his law classes at college. While she was pregnant, they considered moving in together, but the relationship was already deteriorating; so, Oliveira chose to live with her daughter in her parents' house.
 
Eleven months after Isabella's birth, Ana Carolina left Alexandre when she was convinced that he was cheating on her. At first, since she was too young, Isabella was constantly with her mother, but as the child grew they established a routine: Nardoni would have Isabella over from Friday to Sunday night twice in a month. By then, Nardoni was already married to Anna Carolina Jatobá, with whom he has two sons together, Pietro and Cauã.

Nardoni began seeing Jatobá, who was his colleague at Law school, behind Oliveira's back while she was still pregnant with Isabella. He carried on with both relationships for a year, until Oliveira dumped him after she was convinced he was cheating on her.

After Isabella's murder, Oliveira claimed that Jatobá was very jealous of her past with Nardoni. After some time, Jatobá took over talking with Oliveira about Isabella, instead of Nardoni. Oliveira also said that Nardoni's family avoided leaving Isabella with her stepmother, and that when Nardoni wasn't around, his sister would sleep with the family. A neighbor also told police Isabella's paternal grandmother said that Jatobá was crazy and was capable of someday dropping the girl from the apartment. A friend of Oliveira that chose to remain anonymous told press that Isabella sometimes came back from Nardoni's house crying, and she often wanted to go back to her mother earlier than expected.

Murder

At 22:30 of Saturday, 29 March 2008, Isabella Oliveira Nardoni fell from the sixth floor of Edifício London, where her father Alexandre Nardoni lived with Isabella's stepmother Anna Carolina Jatobá and their two sons Cauã and Pietro. She was found suffering from cardiac arrest in the front garden of Edifício London. Rescue personnel tried to resuscitate her for 34 minutes, but were unsuccessful. She died on the way to the hospital. Nardoni and Jatobá were taken to a local police station. Nardoni told police officers that when he arrived with the family at the building, Isabella was already sleeping, so he went up with her first. He left Jatobá with their sons in the car, placed Isabella in the guest room, turned on the bedside lamp and a lamp in the boys' room, locked the door and went back down to the car.

According to Nardoni, he and Jatobá took Pietro and Cauã to the apartment and when they arrived there, he noticed that the light in Isabella's room was on. Nardoni said he didn't find Isabella in her bed when he returned to the apartment, and that she stayed from five to ten minutes on her own; he noticed the hole in the window's safety net, looked out and down and saw Isabella's body on the front yard. He yelled at Jatobá to call his father, which she did, and then she called her own father. Isabella's mother would later say in an interview that Jatobá was hysterical when they spoke on the phone, screaming that Isabella had fallen. According to Oliveira, Jatobá was screaming so much that she had believed Isabella had accidentally fallen into the building's pool and told her to perform CPR on the child.

Once Ana Carolina arrived at the site and realized how badly injured her daughter was, she refrained from touching Isabella, out of fear of worsening her condition. She however often kissed her daughter, and told her to be calm and that everything was going to be all right, and that she loved her. Isabella was taken to a hospital, but she died as a result of her injuries.

Burial

Isabella was buried in the “Parque dos Pinheiros” Cemetery, in the São Paulo district of Jaçanã. The service was attended by 200 people.

Investigation
Investigators found Isabella's blood in Nardoni's car and in his apartment, on a towel and a diaper, her vomit on his T-shirt, footprints of her flip-flops on a bed next to the window through which she was thrown, and traces of nylon from the wire safety screen on his T-shirt. The police also found fragments of the safety screen on a pair of scissors inside the apartment.

Although there was circumstantial evidence to suggest that Isabella was thrown to her death from a bedroom window, her injuries were not consistent with a falling death. Only her wrists were broken, in addition to the fact that she was still alive, albeit barely, when she was discovered. The IML (Instituto Médico Legal, or Legal Medical Institute) personnel announced that they found injuries unrelated to the fall on Isabella's body. The injuries suggested that she had been punched and asphyxiated before being thrown out of the window.

On 18 April 2008, both Nardoni and Jatobá were indicted by the São Paulo Civil Police. They continued to claim innocence.

Trial
Alexandre Nardoni and Anna Carolina Jatobá's trial began on 22 March 2010, almost two years (to the day) after Isabella's death. On the first day of trial, Ana Carolina Oliveira testified. She said Jatobá was extremely jealous of her, and that Alexandre had once threatened to kill her and her mother and then vanish with Isabella when Ana Carolina confronted him over late alimony payments. She also said Anna Jatobá was the one to call her on the night of Isabella's death, and screamed to her that it was all her daughter's fault.

Ana Carolina was later requested by the defense attorney to remain in the court house so she could meet with Nardoni and Jatobá. She remained in a tiny bedroom at the court house for three more days—until a psychiatrist said she was under extreme stress and she was released.

On 25 March 2010, Alexandre and Anna Carolina testified in front of the jury. Both denied having murdered Isabella. Anna cried during her testimony. Alexandre took the stand at 10:45 a.m, and was dismissed at 16:25. Alexandre told the jury that the cops responsible for dealing with Isabella's case proposed that he admit he had killed the child, saying he could rule the case as an accidental homicide with no intent to kill. Alexandre also claimed he felt humiliated by this and that the police weren't actually interested in figuring out what had happened in the building the day Isabella died. Nardoni cried three times during his testimony and said that the day Isabella died was the worst of his life, that he had lost the most precious thing in his life and that he was unaware of what was going on. He also accused Ana Carolina's mother of not wanting her to have the child.

He also said he didn't remember having mentioned in his testimony to the cops that there was a third person in his apartment the day Isabella was murdered. The defense attorney had mentioned that someone else had broken into the apartment and thrown the girl out of the window, but Nardoni denied that he had seen someone, and said that he had locked Isabella in the apartment.

Nardoni shocked the audience and jury when, after being questioned by DA Francisco Cembranelli on why he didn't think of helping Isabella, he first said that he was making sure she was alive. Cembranelli said she was, and insisted; Nardoni then said he was in shock. After Cembranelli asked for a third time why he didn't think of trying to do anything to help the girl, Nardoni finally answered that when he became aware of what was going on, a neighbor ordered him not to touch Isabella.

Another shocking moment occurred when Cembranelli asked why Nardoni hadn't spoken to Oliveira during Isabella's funeral and wake. Nardoni simply answered it was an embarrassing situation.

After a lunch break, it was Jatobá's turn, and she spoke until a quarter to nine p.m. During her testimony, Jatobá said that the accusations against her and Nardoni were completely false. She also gave more details about the family's relationship with Isabella. She also said that the girl was very attached to her. Jatobá also admitted that when she was being questioned by the police, she had "embellished" and "made up" stories such as being beat up by her father.

However, in their testimony, Jatobá and Nardoni constantly contradicted each other. While Nardoni claimed they had normal fights, she admitted they fought constantly and very nastily.

After a five-day-long trial, in the early hours of 27 March 2010, Alexandre Nardoni was sentenced to 31 years, 1 month and 10 days of imprisonment; Anna Carolina Jatobá, to 26 years and 8 months for Isabella's death. It counted against both the fact that Isabella was less than 14 when she was murdered; against Nardoni weighted the fact that he is Isabella's father. Nardoni and Jatobá also were convicted of procedural fraud to 8 months of imprisonment (for trying to clean up the crime scene). According to the Brazilian law, both sentences are to be served concurrently. During the sentence reading, Nardoni was expressionless, while Jatobá cried. Outside the forum, people celebrated their sentence with fireworks.

References

External links

Isabella Nardoni at Google News

2008 deaths
2008 murders in Brazil
Child abuse resulting in death
Deaths by defenestration
Incidents of violence against girls
Murdered Brazilian children
People murdered in Brazil
Filicides